The 2019 Asian Formula Renault Series (aka AFR Series) was the 20th season of the AFR Series since its creation in 2000 by FRD. The season began on 23 March at the Zhuhai International Circuit and ended at the same venue on 8 December after five events. Joey Alders won the 2019 Championship in his debut season with his team BlackArts Racing Team.

Starting from 2015, drivers and teams compete in two classes, Pro (Class A) for drivers and teams competing with the 2013 FR2.0 car, and Elite (Class B) for drivers and teams using the FR2.0 old spec cars.

Teams and drivers

Race calendar and results

Championship standings

Points system

Points are awarded to the top 14 classified finishers. Drivers in Pro and Elite classes are classified separately.

Drivers' Championships

References

External links
 

Asian
Formula Renault seasons
Formula Renault Series
Asian Formula Renault